Brännland is a locality situated in Umeå Municipality, Västerbotten County, Sweden with 220 inhabitants in 2010.

References

See also
 Blue Highway, tourist route (Norway - Sweden - Finland - Russia)

Populated places in Umeå Municipality